The Spartocids or Spartocidae was the name of a Hellenized Thracian dynasty that ruled the Hellenistic Kingdom of Bosporus between the years 438–108 BC. They had usurped the former dynasty, the Archaeanactids, a Greek dynasty of the Bosporan Kingdom who were tyrants of Panticapaeum from 480 - 438 BC. The throne of the Bosporan kingdom was usurped by Spartokos I in 438 BC, from whom the dynasty is named after.

Spartokos's descendants would continue to rule the Bosporus until 108 BC, in which it was briefly conquered by the invading Scythians led by Saumacus. The dynasty continued to repeat the names of succeeding princes, with the final Spartokos being named Spartokos V. The dynasty also had inter-marriages, notably the marriage of Komosarye and Paerisades I. The most famous known ruler is Leukon I, who expanded the kingdom beyond its boundaries, resisted the Scythians, and ruled for 40 years.

History
The Spartocids are thought to be of Thracian origin, and to have connections with the Odrysian dynasty, the rulers of the Odrysian Kingdom. Spartokos I is often thought to have been a Thracian mercenary who was hired by the Archaeanactids, and that he usurped the Archaeanactids in around 438 BC, becoming "king" of the Bosporan Kingdom, then only a few cities, such as Panticapaeum. Spartokos was succeeded by his son, Satyros I, who would go on to conquer many cities around Panticapaeum such as Nymphaeum and Kimmerikon. Satyros's son, Leukon I, would go to conquer and expand the kingdom beyond boundaries his father ever thought of.

Leukon would also engage in wars against the Ixomatae, Sindoi, and Heracleans. His brother, Gorgippos, would rule from the Asiatic side of the kingdom, specifically in Sindia, the former capital of the Sindike Kingdom, and renaming it Gorgippia, probably after himself.

The Spartocid rulers seem have jointly ruled with their sons and brothers. Leukon's sons, Spartokos II and Paerisades I, jointly ruled until Spartokos's death five years into his reign. This can also be seen with Paerisades's own children, Satyros II and Gorgippis II, both of whom co-ruled their father. This same pattern can be seen decades later, with Spartokos IV and Leukon II reign's.

Wars of Expansion
The Spartocids were the leading figures of the Bosporan wars of expansion, a series of conflicts and sieges that occurred from 438 BC to around 350 BC, just before the death of Leukon. These wars resulted in the death of Satyros I and Metrodoros and a perhaps the brother of Satyros, Seleukos. Satyros died in the 1st siege of Theodosia in 389 BC] and Metrodoros was killed by Tirgatao as he was her hostage under a treaty she had with Satyros, before he betrayed her. Upon Satyros's death in 389 BC, Leukon engaged in the Battle of Labrytai which was a dynastic dispute between the original king of the Sindoi, Hekataios, and his son Oktamasades ending with a victory for Leukon and the exile of Oktamasades. Sometime after this, Leukon and Gorgippos became rulers of the Sindike Kingdom. Leukon then started 2 sieges of Theodisa, the 2nd in 365 BC,  and the 3rd siege of the city in 360 BC, ultimately annexing the city into his dominions after a long  with Heraclea Pontica with varying success.

Further Expansion
Paerisades I would marry his cousin, Komosarye, a daughter of Gorgippos and through this marriage, he would become king of the Sindians. He would also engage in a war against invading Scythian tribes, due to him refusing to pay them tribute. Paerisades also, at some point during his reign, took the strategic city of Tanais near the Don River and added several other nomadic tribes to his dominions.

Civil War
The Spartocids would engage in a civil war among each other in about 309 BC, after the death of Paerisades I. The dynastic dispute would include Satyros II who was the eldest, and inherited the throne, Prytanis, and Eumelos, who had a claim to the throne. The war was carried into 2 large engagements, starting with the Battle of the River Thatis and later the Siege of Siracena, in which Satyros II lost his life. Eumelos, after defeating his elder brother Satyros, attempted to divide the kingdom with Prytanis, but the latter refused, leading to his eventual defeat near the Maeotic Lake and death at the Eumelos' hands. Under Eumelos's reign, the Bosporan Kingdom enjoyed much military success, purging the Black Sea of nearly all pirates, and was large enough to rival the state of Lysimachus, one of Alexander's powerful generals. Eumelos's son, Spartokos III, was then able to re-establish their trade agreements with Athens and was the first Spartocid ruler to assume the title of "basileus". His son, or nephew, Paerisades II, was unexpectedly active in diplomacy between the kingdoms of the Diadochi, being mentioned as sending ambassadors to Ptolemy II and doing cup offerings with Antigonus II at Delos.

Decline
The Bosporan Kingdom entered into a decline due to numerous attacks from nomadic Scythian tribes in the subsequent centuries leading up to its fall. The last Spartocid rulers, Paerisades III, Kamasarye II Philoteknos, Paerisades IV and Paerisades V were under extreme pressure from Scythian attacks. Paerisades V, the last of his dynasty, offered his kingdom to Mithridates VI in exchange for the protection of his people and of himself. Diophantus, Mithridates's general, barely escaped the rebellion led by Saumacus, a possible Scythian and Paerisades V's adoptive heir. Paerisades V died in Panticapaeum at Saumacus' hands, ending Spartocid rule in the Cimmerian Bosporus.

Spartocid Rulers

Genealogy
The following genealogy is based upon Ferdinand Justi, Iranisches Namenbuch, (Marburg, Berlin, 1884), (Heidelsheim, 1963), p. 400:

References

Further reading 
 Гайдукевич В.Ф. Боспорское царство. М.—Л., 1949 (лит.).
 Полная библиография работ П.О. Карышковского на русском и английском языках на сайте Фридман А.С

 
438 BC
Ancient Greece
Greek colonies in Crimea
Monarchs of the Bosporan Kingdom
5th-century BC establishments
2nd-century BC disestablishments
Hellenistic dynasties